Monocelis is a genus of flatworms belonging to the family Monocelididae.

The genus has cosmopolitan distribution.

Species:

Monocelis alboguttata 
Monocelis algicola 
Monocelis anguilla 
Monocelis anta 
Monocelis balanocephala 
Monocelis beata 
Monocelis cincta 
Monocelis cirrhosa 
Monocelis colpotriplicis 
Monocelis corallicola 
Monocelis durhami 
Monocelis exquisita 
Monocelis fasciata 
Monocelis fuhrmanni 
Monocelis fusca 
Monocelis galapagoensis 
Monocelis gamblei 
Monocelis gracilis 
Monocelis hopkinsi 
Monocelis lacteus 
Monocelis lata 
Monocelis lineata 
Monocelis longiceps 
Monocelis longistyla 
Monocelis macrobulbus 
Monocelis mediterranea 
Monocelis nexilis 
Monocelis nitida 
Monocelis non-scripta 
Monocelis oculifera 
Monocelis pardus 
Monocelis parvula 
Monocelis pictocephala 
Monocelis psilus 
Monocelis rotulifer 
Monocelis rupisrubrae 
Monocelis spatulicauda 
Monocelis spectator 
Monocelis tabira 
Monocelis tenella 
Monocelis viridirostris 
Monocelis viridorostris 
Monocelis wilhelmii

References

Platyhelminthes